Cumberland Highway is a  long urban highway located in Sydney, New South Wales, Australia. The highway links Pacific Highway and Pacific Motorway (M1) at Pearces Corner, Wahroonga in the northeast with Hume Highway at Liverpool in the southwest. This name covers a few consecutive roads and is widely known to most drivers, but the entire allocation is also known – and signposted – by the names of its constituent parts: Pennant Hills Road, James Ruse Drive, Briens Road, Old Windsor Road, Hart Drive, Freame Street, Emert Street, Jersey Road, Betts Road, Warren Road, Smithfield Road, Palmerston Road, (New) Cambridge Street, Joseph Street and Orange Grove Road. The entire length of Cumberland Highway is designated part of route A28.

The name of the highway is derived from the Cumberland Plain and Cumberland County. The name Cumberland was conferred on the county by Governor Arthur Phillip in honour of Ernest Augustus, Duke of Cumberland.

Route

Cumberland Highway commences at Pearces Corner – the intersection of Pacific Highway and Pennant Hills Road at Wahroonga – as Pennant Hills Road and heads in a southwesterly direction as a dual-carriageway, six-lane road, through Pennant Hills, narrowing to a single-carriageway, four-lane road through Carlingford, before reaching the interchange with James Ruse Drive. Cumberland Highway then follows James Ruse Drive westwards as a dual-carraigeway, six-lane road to the interchange with Windsor Road in Northmead, where it changes name to Briens Road and continues west until it intersects with and changes name to Old Windsor Road, shortly afterwards reaching the intersection with Hart Drive at Constitution Hill. Cumberland Highway then follows Hart Drive in a southwesterly direction, changing name to Freame Street once it crosses under the North Shore and Western railway line in Wentworthville, and then intersects with and changes name to Emert Street shortly afterwards, before reaching the intersection with Great Western Highway. Cumberland Highway continues south as Jersey Road, then as Betts Road south of the intersection with Merrylands Road in Greystanes, then intersects with and changes name to Warren Road in Smithfield, heading in a southwesterly direction. After crossing Prospect Creek it changes name again to Smithfield Road, before heading south along Palmerston Road and narrowing to a four-lane road in Fairfield West, changing name again to New Cambridge Street south of the intersection with Hamilton Road, then intersects with and changes name to Cambridge Street through Canley Heights, before it intersects with and changes name to Joseph Street in Cabramatta, before finally changing name to Orange Grove Road south of the intersection with Cabramatta Road West. The highway eventually terminates at the intersection with Hume Highway in the northern fringes of Liverpool.

History

Cumberland Highway was created from a series of pre-existing roads through western and north-western suburban Sydney, not all contiguous at the time, with Pennant Hills Road in particular already declared as a major arterial route 60 years before it was eventually incorporated into the modern-day highway. The construction of a ring road around Parramatta and increasing traffic levels in western Sydney in the late 1970s became the pre-cursor to today's highway.

The passing of the Main Roads Act of 1924 through the Parliament of New South Wales provided for the declaration of Main Roads, roads partially funded by the State government through the Main Roads Board (later the Department of Main Roads, and eventually Transport for NSW). Main Road No. 13 was declared on 8 August 1928, from the intersection with Great Northern Highway (today Pacific Highway) at Pearce's Corner in Wahroonga, via Pennant Hills Road to Parramatta (and continuing south via Church Street and Woodville Road to the intersection with Great Southern Highway (today Hume Highway) at Lansdowne); with the passing of the Main Roads (Amendment) Act of 1929 to provide for additional declarations of State Highways and Trunk Roads, this was amended to State Highway 13 on 8 April 1929.

State Highway 13 eventually assumed the role of a western bypass of Sydney, made official when it was declared as part of Ring Road 5 in 1964. Ring Road 5 was superseded by State Route 55 in 1974, but by this stage, the growth of Sydney's west had turned the bypass road into a primary arterial road with a huge increase in freight traffic.

In December 1981, Old Windsor Road was realigned at its southern end, to feed directly into Briens Road and the final section of the Parramatta Ring Road. This new road section would eventually form part of the Cumberland Highway a few years later.

In 1984, the state government announced a new highway that would supersede the Church Street/Woodville Road route as the major connection between the Pacific and Hume Highways. The existing roads of Hart Drive, Freame Street, Emert Street, Jersey Road, Betts Road, Warren Road, Smithfield Road, Palmerston Road, Cambridge Street, Joseph Street and Orange Grove Road were widened and connected to each other to form a continuous road. The first of these to be completed was between Harris Road and Freame Street railway underpass at Wentworthville.

With the completion of the section between Great Western Highway and Jersey Road, State Highway 13 was altered to use the new route and also named Cumberland Highway on 26 August 1988, from the intersection with Pacific Highway in Wahroonga via Parramatta to the intersection with Hume Highway at Liverpool. State Route 77 was allocated to the entire length of the highway, subsuming State Route 55 between Parramatta and Wahroonga; the northern end of State Route 55 was truncated to meet State Route 77 at Pennant Hills Road.

The passing of the Roads Act of 1993 through the Parliament of New South Wales updated road classifications and the way they could be declared within New South Wales. Under this act, Cumberland Highway today retains its declaration as Highway 13, from the intersection with Pacific Highway in Wahroonga via Parramatta to the intersection with Hume Highway at Liverpool.

Since 1994, various parts of Cumberland Highway have been upgraded, including the widening of Pennant Hills Road.

Post-Westlink M7 and NorthConnex
With the opening of the Westlink M7 motorway in December 2005, the Metroad 7 route south of M2 Hills Motorway was decommissioned and rerouted onto the Westlink M7, leaving only the section north of M2 Hills Motorway along Pennant Hills Road designated as Metroad 7; Metroad 6 was extended northwards from Carlingford along Pennant Hills Road to meet M2 Hills Motorway at the same time, leaving the rest of Cumberland Highway west of Carlingford without a route number. With the conversion to the newer alphanumeric system in 2013, Cumberland Highway was re-designated part of route A28, replacing the last remnant of Metroads 6 and 7 along Pennant Hills Road.

Since its opening, all trucks and buses over 12.5 metres long or over 2.8 metres clearance height (except vehicles transporting dangerous goods, oversize vehicles, or that have a genuine destination only accessible via Pennant Hills Road) travelling between the M1 and M2 are forbidden to use Pennant Hills Road and must use the NorthConnex tunnels instead. Trucks and buses will be monitored by two gantries located along Pennant Hills Road, one at Normanhurst and one at Beecroft / West Pennant Hills. A fine of A$194 with no demerit points will also be imposed on truck and bus drivers detected (with the use of cameras mounted on gantries) using Pennant Hills Road with the traffic flow.

Exits and interchanges

See also

 NorthConnex

References

External links

Sydney Metroads